Kaoma was a French-Brazilian band formed in 1988 by Loalwa Braz (lead vocals), Chyco Dru (bass), Jacky Arconte (guitar), Jean-Claude Bonaventure (keyboard), Michel Abihssira (drums and percussion) and Fania (backing vocals). Dru is from Martinique, Arconte from Guadeloupe, and Braz from Brazil.

Career
In 1989, they had a major chart-topping international hit with their dance music single "Lambada", a direct cover of the 1986 dance hit "Chorando Se Foi" by Brazilian singer-songwriter Márcia Ferreira, which itself was a legally authorized Portuguese-translated rendition of the original slow ballad "Llorando se fue" (1981) by Bolivian group Los Kjarkas. Given Kaoma's clear act of plagiarism and release of their single without Los Kjarkas' permission, Los Kjarkas successfully sued. "Dançando Lambada" and "Mélodie d'amour" were the next two singles and were also hits, although they failed to earn the same success as "Lambada", which itself peaked at number 46 in the US Billboard Hot 100. "Lambada" fared better in Europe, reaching number 4 in the UK Singles Chart.

Also in 1989, Kaoma released their first album Worldbeat which achieved worldwide success, becoming - along with Beto Barbosa - one of the legends of Brazilian lambada. At the 1990 Lo Nuestro Awards, Kaoma won two awards for Pop Group of the Year and New Pop Artist of the Year.

In 1991, Kaoma released the album Tribal-Pursuit which provided the singles "Danca tago-mago" and "Moço do dende".

On January 19, 2017, Braz was found dead in her car. Police arrested three suspects for the murder; several motives were suspected, such as a botched robbery or a revenge killing.

Discography

Singles

References

External links
 Kaoma Lambada webpage

Zouk musicians
French dance music groups
Brazilian dance music groups
Worldbeat groups
Epic Records artists